Za dom spremni! was a salute used during World War II by the Croatian Ustaše movement. It was the Ustaše equivalent of the fascist or Nazi salute Sieg Heil.

Usage during World War II

During World War II, the Ustaša, a movement of radical Croatian nationalists and fascists, which ruled the Axis puppet state Independent State of Croatia (1941–45), created after the Invasion of Yugoslavia, and conducted genocidal campaigns against Serbs, Jews and Romani people. The salute "Za Dom – spremni!" was immediately instituted as a new, revolutionary salute to be used in official correspondence and everyday life. On 10 April 1941, Slavko Kvaternik, designated commander-in-chief of the State's Armed Forces, and deputy of state leader (Poglavnik) Ante Pavelić proclaimed the establishment of the state on Radio Zagreb, and ended the statement with Bog i Hrvati! Za dom spremni! (God and the Croats! For the homeland prepared!)

In October 1941, state minister of education and culture Mile Budak issued strict rules regarding the mandatory usage of the salute. In July 1941, Ustaša commissar for Sarajevo, Jure Francetić, issued a circular to state authorities on the importance of using the Ustaša greeting. As British historian Rory Yeomans notes, the Ustaša authorities were disappointed with the low acceptance of the salute among the population, even in the areas where the new regime enjoyed support. State officials and the government-controlled press constantly complained about the lack of the usage of the new salute, and they threatened with sanctions and reprimanded those who did not use it.

In 1944, newspapers admonished the readers that "in the Independent State of Croatia there exists only one greeting: For the homeland – prepared!" According to Yeomans, Ustaša movement saw the usage of the new greeting as "not only the question of ideological purity, but also the national pride." Ustaša official Mijo Bzik furiously attacked all other greetings as foreign, servile and slavish. All official government and military reports and documents usually ended with "Za dom spremni." Ante Pavelić used the salute to end all of his private correspondence, even after the war ended, in exile (1945–56).

As a part of their new cultural and language policy, the government took an effort to replace "hello" when answering the phone with "prepared" (though, somewhat ironically, the former is and was used in Germany of which NDH was an ally). State Intelligence and Propaganda Bureau (DIPU) wanted to assess how many people used the salute by calling them randomly on the phone and recording whether they answered with "hello" or "prepared". Some of those who did not answer with "prepared" had their telephones confiscated.

During this time, the salute was used in various ways, for example as "Za poglavnika i za dom spremni!" (For Poglavnik and homeland ready) and in form of a question and answer: "Za dom?! – Spremni", "Za koga?! – Za poglavnika" ("For homeland?! – Prepared!", "For whom?! For Poglavnik!"). There was also usage of Za Boga i poglavnika svoga – Uvijek spremni! ("For God and Our Poglavnik – Always Prepared!") on various flags of NDH.

Modern usage

The salute was used in Croatia and Bosnia and Herzegovina during the Croatian War of Independence and Bosnian War. Croatian Defence Forces, the paramilitary arm of the right-wing Croatian Party of Rights, emulating Ustaša forces and using their iconography, adopted it as their official salute and included it in their logo. This salute was an official slogan of the party's branch in Bosnia, Croatian Party of Rights of Bosnia and Herzegovina, until April 2012, when it was replaced by Semper fidelis.

Croatian singer Thompson used the salute at the beginning of his wartime song Bojna Čavoglave and in the song Golubovi bijeli. The chant is often heard among fans in his concerts. In the song Srce vatreno by Nered and Zaprešić Boys, the salute was also used in the middle of the song, but was later replaced with U boj.

The chant is sometimes used by nationalist football fans in Croatia. In 2013, Croatian international football player Josip Šimunić led the chant four times with the crowd in Zagreb after Croatia beat Iceland to qualify for the 2014 World Cup finals. He was subsequently banned for ten matches and fined by FIFA, which barred him from participating in the 2014 World Cup finals. Šimunić denied supporting "any form of intolerance or bigotry."

In August 2015, a number of conservative and right-wing public figures and Catholic clergy members (including most notably Sisak bishop Vlado Košić and auxiliary bishop of Zagreb Valentin Pozaić) signed a petition and an open letter to the President of Croatia Grabar-Kitarović and to the chairman of Croatian Democratic Union Tomislav Karamarko, calling for the introduction of the salute as the official salute of the Armed Forces of Croatia. In June 2016 Elvis Duspara, a Catholic blogger and columnist, published a book titled "Za dom spremni" in Zagreb, focusing on whitewashing the salute and claiming that "this salute is in the DNA of every Croat." Croatian mathematician and academic, controversial far-right writer Josip Pečarić, published a similar book titled "Diary Under the Sign of Za Dom Spremni". Its presentation on public premises was rejected by Tisno local authorities.

In November 2016 in Jasenovac a plaque commemorating members of Croatian Defence Forces killed in action 1991-2 was unveiled, containing CDF emblem with the salute "Za dom spremni". This caused an outrage as Jasenovac is the site of the biggest Ustaša-led concentration camp and a memorial area for 80,000 ethnic minorities, resistance fighters and political opponents of Ustaša regime that perished there 1941-5. Jewish, Serb, Roma, and WWII veteran organisations as well as opposition parties boycotted the government-led annual commemoration in April 2017, protesting the fact that Croatian government has not removed the inscription. The plaque was finally removed 10 months later, in September 2017, to be placed in nearby Novska. In similar cases, as CDF emblem included the salute, their emblem on war flags and memorials was altered to remove it, most recently when a monument in Split was unveiled in 2014 and during the 2015 military parade in Zagreb. CDF emblem with the salute was also painted in a graffiti mural in Mokošica, a neighbourhood of Dubrovnik.

Croatian computer scientist Filip Rodik analyzed the prevalence of the salute among Facebook comments on right-wing or conservative news portals and Facebook profiles between 2012 and 2017. Rodik found that out of 4.5 million comments, 33,000 comments used the salute in the affirmative manner. More than 10,000 individual users left at least one message/comment including "Za dom spremni." Rodik also noted an increase in the frequency and spread of its usage: in 2014 1,700 individual users used it at least once, in 2015 they numbered 3,400, while in 2016 the number stood at 4,700. The salute is sometimes also abbreviated into "ZDS." The Serb National Council of Croatia in its report on anti-Serb sentiment in 2017 reported that the salute was used 11,309 times in the comment sections of the 4 far-right Facebook profiles.

A Croatian political study published in early 2019, using empirical research testing public attitudes towards contentious political symbols, found that in Croatian society "...from 2016 to 2018 the proclivity to ban the local fascist slogan For the Homeland Ready significantly increased to 50%, as a sign of growing criticism and aversion. (...) Nevertheless, when we move to [discussion on] recent violent history, relative majority of 47% of citizens advocates preservation of the Homeland War monuments that contain the fascist slogan For the Homeland Ready." The authors further opined "when this slogan is used as a part of commemoration of the soldiers who fought in the Homeland War, it is impossible to separate the positive value of patriotic struggle for Croatia's independence from revisionist acceptance of the legacy of fascist NDH and the persecution of the Serbian minority as a legitimate political goal."

Legal status

Croatia
The Constitutional Court of Croatia has in at least three separate occasions (May and December 2016) upheld the decisions of lower courts ruling that individuals who used the salute have committed an offense against the public order and have incited to hatred (similarly to the concept of Volksverhetzung in German law). Due to his chant at a football stadium, Josip Šimunić was sentenced for "incitement to hatred based on racial, ethnic and religious grounds, as the salute was used in NDH and is a manifestation of racist ideology." This was also the opinion of the High Misdemeanor Court of Croatia, which ruled that those using the salute "expressed unacceptable political ideas, upon which Republic of Croatia as a ( ... ) democratic country is not based." In August 2019, in a verdict on the case of the salute's usage in nationalist war-time Bojna Cavoglave song, High Misdemeanor Court held that the salute was an offence against the article 39 of the constitution which bans incitement to hatred. Song performer's earlier conviction was thus upheld. However, in June 2020 High Misdemeanor Court's judiciary council decided on appeal that singer Marko Perković Thompson has not committed an offense against public order by using the salute in his song. This decision has been heavily criticized by Croatia's legal experts as stepping outside of the legal and constitutional order or even rules of procedure. Constitutional Court issued a public statement reminding it had ruled the salute as an "Ustaša salute" and found it in breach of the constitution.

In December 2016, state administration office in Varaždin refused to verify and register CDF veterans' organization statute and emblem due to its emblem containing the salute. Administration office ruled that it is "an established fact that the salute [ ... ] was used as an official salute of the totalitarian regime of the Independent State of Croatia and, as such, is rooted as a symbol of racist ideology, expressing contempt for other people due to their religious and ethnic identity and trivialising crimes against humanity". The office found the salute to be in violation of Croatian Constitution and the Law on Association.

The salute is not explicitly banned by law in Croatia. The police usually views it as implicitly banned by misdemeanor laws and anti-discrimination laws and treats it as an offense rather than a crime (hate speech). For instance, during a house search and seizure of an illegal weapon in June 2017 in Kistanje near Knin, the police have removed the shirt with the salute from a man who was wearing it and charged him with the offence against the public order.

In 2011, a municipal court in Knin dismissed the case against a craftsman who sold souvenirs which contained the salute Za dom spremni. The court ruled that accused didn't wear clothing or souvenirs with slogan that encourage national, racial or religious hatred, but instead he was selling them. While the former is punishable by law, the latter is not. The court ruling cited defendant's claim that "Za dom spremni is an old Croatian salute known throughout history" as a part of the defense statement, however, it didn't state any opinion on that subject.

Austria
Local authorities and security agency in Austria have noted that the salute and other Ustaša symbols are undesirable during the annual Bleiburg commemoration in Carinthia. However, as they are not explicitly covered by Austrian laws banning Nazi insignia and symbols, they are often observed at the commemorations. The Greens and many civil organizations have therefore asked Carinthian and federal Austrian authorities to ban the gathering. In the spring of 2018, many federal politicians across the party spectrum supported a stricter enforcement of the Austrian laws against hate speech and Nazi insignia. After the Austrian government decided to send additional law enforcement and judiciary to control the gathering in 2018, the organizers decided to ban any flags, especially those with the CDF emblem and the salute Za dom spremni. The authorities announced that any expression of the salute will be punished.

In November 2018, the Austrian federal government included fascist Ustaša symbols and gestures/greetings amidst other extremist organization symbols (such as those of ISIS, Al-Quaida and Muslim Brotherhood) as the target of a new Law on Symbols (Symbole-Gesetz) proposed to the parliament. The use of Ustaša symbols and greetings will be punishable by up to a 1-month in prison or up to €4,000 fine, while the repeated offense will be punished by up to €10,000 fine or six weeks in prison. The exact list of symbols and greetings will be outlined through a separate government decision by March 1, 2019.

Za dom
Modern proponents of the salute claim its alleged continuity and tradition predating the pre-World War II period. Historian Hrvoje Klasić from the Zagreb Faculty of Humanities and Social Sciences stated that Za dom spremni as a phrase has not been documented in any historical document prior to the 1941 formation of the Independent State of Croatia. Other prominent Croatian historians Tvrtko Jakovina and Ante Nazor, as well as former Minister of Culture Zlatko Hasanbegović, also a historian, supported this view.

Supporters of the salute say that the words Za dom were used in the 19th century by Ban Josip Jelačić, while he was leading the army from Varaždin into a battle with Hungarians. Allegedly, the army replied with: "Spremni!". However, historians have found no historical document or any other credible evidence quoting Jelačić using Za dom! Instead, the phrase Za dom i narod Slavjanski appears on a decorative mini gloriette presented to Jelačić commemorating the events of 1848.

The words Za dom were previously also used in Pavao Ritter Vitezović's 1684 work Odiljenje sigetsko (Siege of Szigetvár), in the opera Nikola Šubić Zrinski (Nikola Šubić Zrinski) composed by Ivan Zajc in 1876, and several poems published in the mid-19th century issues of the Danica, the literary magazine published with the early Narodne novine.

The phrase Za dom was documented as a salute in a 1939 issue of a Varaždin weekly Hrvatsko jedinstvo.

See also
Na stráž, a Slovak fascist salute

References

Sources

External links
 

Croatian nationalism
Croatian nationalism in Bosnia and Herzegovina
Independent State of Croatia
Yugoslav Wars
Mottos
Ustaše
Far-right politics in Croatia
Croatian irredentism
Political terminology of Croatia